18-Year-Old Virgin is a 2009 American sex comedy film directed by Tamara Olson, written by Naomi L. Selfman and starring Olivia Alaina May, Lauren Walsh and Todd Leigh. It was produced by The Asylum.

Premise
18-year-old virgin, Katie Powers lusts after fellow student, Ryan Lambert and hopes to have sex with him at the high school graduation party. However, Ryan has a policy of not having sex with virgins. This leads Katie on a quest to lose her virginity before the night of the party.

Cast

References

External links
 18 Year Old Virgin at The Asylum
 

2009 films
2009 direct-to-video films
2000s sex comedy films
2009 independent films
2000s teen comedy films
American sex comedy films
American teen comedy films
The Asylum films
Direct-to-video comedy films
2000s English-language films
Films about virginity
2009 comedy films
2000s American films
English-language comedy films